Francesco Di Giorno (born 22 February 2000) is an Italian football player. He plays for Belvedere.

Club career

Crotone
He is the product of Crotone youth teams.

Loan to Rende
He joined Serie C club Rende on a season-long loan for the 2018–19 season. He made his Serie C debut for Rende on 21 October 2018 in a game against Bisceglie as an 88th-minute substitute for Roberto Sabato. He ended his loan spell early with just 5 substitute appearances for a total of 27 minutes of field time.

Loan to Modena
On 30 January 2019 he moved on new loan to Serie D club Modena.

Loan to Este
On 9 July 2019, he signed with Este on loan, again in Serie D.

References

External links
 

2000 births
Sportspeople from the Province of Cosenza
Footballers from Calabria
Living people
Italian footballers
Association football midfielders
Modena F.C. players
Serie C players
Serie D players